Alphonse-Victor Angot, or l'abbé Angot (10 February 1844 – 10 June 1917), was a French historian who specialized in the history of Mayenne (département).

Origins 
Angot was born in Montsûrs. At age eleven, he entered a small seminary in Précigné. His mother was a lodger with the Augustines in Baugé and an aunt lived among them. In 1863 he returned to the grand seminary. He died in Saint-Fraimbault de Lassay.

References

1917 deaths
1844 births
People from Mayenne
19th-century French historians
French male non-fiction writers